"Til I Am Myself Again" is a song written and recorded by Canadian country rock group Blue Rodeo. Released in November 1990, it was the first single from their album Casino. The song reached number 1 on the RPM Country Tracks chart in March 1991.

Content
The song is composed in the key of G major with a moderate tempo. The verses follow the chord pattern G-C-G-D/F-Em-C-D twice, while the chorus uses the chord pattern Am-Bm-C-D four times before ending on a G chord. An uncredited review of Casino in the Grand Junction Daily Sentinel compared the song's sound to that of The Byrds, noting the use of twelve-string guitar in creating such a sound. The review also said that the song had a "majestic melody" and that both it and "What Am I Doing Here" off the same album were "musical triumphs over adversity with classic hooks."

Chart performance

Year-end charts

References

1990 singles
1990 songs
Blue Rodeo songs
Songs written by Greg Keelor
Songs written by Jim Cuddy